Jatibarang Lor is a village in Jatibarang District of Brebes Regency, Province Central Java, Indonesia.

Villages in Central Java